Mon pote le gitan (French: "My buddy the Gypsy"), is a French comedy film from 1959, directed by François Gir, written by Alain Blancel, starring Louis de Funès. In Italy the film is known under the title: "Il dottor zivago". the scenario was written on the basis of "Les Pittuiti's" of Michel Duran.

Cast 
 Jean Richard : M Pittuiti, the Gypsy
 Louis de Funès : M. Védrines, editor
 Gregori Chmara : Le "Pépé"
 Michel Subor : Bruno Pittuiti, the son of the Gypsy
 Guy Bertil : Théo Védrines, the son of the editor
 Lila Kedrova : La "Choute"
 Brigitte Auber : Odette, la bonne
 Simone Paris : Mrs Védrines
 Anne Doat : Gisèle Védrines, daughter
 Joseph Reinhardt : the musician
 Thérésa Dmitri : Zita Pittuiti, daughter
 Jacqueline Caurat : the reporter
 Luce Fabiole
 Jacques Verrières
 Odile "Maguy" Poisson
 Robert Destain
 François Bonnefois
 Eliane Martel
 Monique Dagand

References

External links 
 
 Mon pote le gitan (1959) at the Films de France

1959 films
French comedy films
1950s French-language films
French black-and-white films
Films about Romani people
1959 comedy films
1950s French films